Irresistible was the only solo album for Tammi Terrell, which was released in January 1969 by Motown Records. Due to complications with a malignant brain tumor in 1968 which caused her death in March 1970, Terrell did not record a subsequent solo album. This album compiles solo recordings Terrell made for Motown between 1965 and 1968. Two of the tracks included on this album were dubbed with vocals from Terrell's frequent singing partner Marvin Gaye to create album tracks for the duo's joint albums. These tracks were "Hold Me Oh My Darling" (on 1967's United) and "I Can't Believe You Love Me" (on 1969's Easy). A re-recorded version of "Come On and See Me" appears on the 1968 Gaye/Terrell album You're All I Need. "This Old Heart of Mine (is Weak for You)" is a remake of the 1966 Isley Brothers' hit by the same name.

Irresistible reached No. 39 on the Billboard R&B albums chart in March 1969.

Terrell's singles from Irresistible and other unreleased songs were re-released on compact disc entitled Tammi Terrell: The Essential Collection by Motown in 2001.

Track listing

Side one
"I Can't Believe You Love Me" (Harvey Fuqua, Johnny Bristol)
"That's What Boys Are Made For" (Fuqua, Gwen Gordy Fuqua)
"Come On and See Me" (Fuqua, Bristol)
"What a Good Man He Is" (Smokey Robinson, Al Cleveland)
"Tears at the End of a Love Affair" (Fuqua, Bristol, Sylvia Moy)
"This Old Heart of Mine (Is Weak for You)" (Holland–Dozier–Holland, Moy)

Side two
"He's the One I Love" (Robinson)
"Can't Stop Now (Love Is Calling)" (James Dean, Stanley McMullen, William Weatherspoon)
"Just Too Much to Hope For" (Fuqua, Bristol, Clyde Wilson, Wilbur Jackson)
"Hold Me Oh My Darling" (Fuqua)
"I Can't Go on Without You" (Fuqua, Bristol, Moy)

Personnel
Tammi Terrell - lead and additional backing vocals
The Andantes and The Spinners - backing vocals
The Funk Brothers - instrumentation

Singles
1966: "I Can't Believe You Love Me" (#72 US, #27 US R&B)
1966: "Come On and See Me" (#80 US, #25 US R&B)
1967: "What a Good Man He Is" (single release canceled)
1969: "This Old Heart Of Mine (Is Weak For You)" (#67 US, #31 US R&B)

Further reading
 Montgomery, Ludie. My Sister Tommie: the Real Tammi Terrell (2005)

References

External links
 Album listing at AllMusic
 Tammi Terrell Album Review "Irresistible"

1969 debut albums
Tammi Terrell albums
Albums produced by Johnny Bristol
Albums produced by Harvey Fuqua
Albums produced by Smokey Robinson
Albums recorded at Hitsville U.S.A.
Motown albums